The Gélise is a tributary of the river Baïse in Gascony, southwestern France.

Etymology 

The name Gélise comes from the Aquitanian hydronymic root Jel, meaning "watercourse."

Geography 

The Gélise originates in the Gers département at Cahuzères, north of Lupiac, then it flows northwest in the direction of Eauze. It drains the land around Castelnau-d'Auzan, then it flows northeast where it forms the natural boundary between the forest of the Landes of Gascony, the slopes of the Armagnac-Ténarèze.

It unites with the Baïse just after passing the fortified mill of Lavardac in Lot-et-Garonne.

The Osse, a right tributary, joins the Gélise near Nérac. The Auzoue, a right tributary, joins the Gélise at Mézin. The Izaute, a right tributary, joins the Gélise at Saint-Pé-Saint-Simon.

Départements and principal cities 

The Gélise passes through the following départements and cities:

 Gers: Dému, Eauze 
 Lot-et-Garonne: Sos, Poudenas, Mézin, Barbaste

References

External links
 The Gélise (Natura 2000) 

Rivers of France
Rivers of Occitania (administrative region)
Rivers of Nouvelle-Aquitaine
Rivers of Gers
Rivers of Lot-et-Garonne